Demetri Goritsas is an American actor of Greek and Norwegian descent. He is best known for his roles as Ethan in the Sky One television series Baddiel's Syndrome and Max Cain in the psychological thriller television series Modus.

He is also best known for his film roles as Parker in the 1998 film Saving Private Ryan (1998), Dr. Perkins in the 2019 film Radioactive (2019) and as Stuart Hutchinson in the 2015 film Everest (2015).

Career
In 1994, Goritsas made his film debut as a minor character in the drama film Little Women, featuring Winona Ryder, Christian Bale and Susan Sarandon. He also appeared as the character Slim Jim Man in the Slim Jim beef jerky commercials in the late 1990s.

He played alongside Jeremy Irons in Gallipoli in 2005 and appeared in the Torchwood series as the father of Jack Harkness. He has also dubbed video games like DRIV3R, Killzone 2, Driver: San Francisco and 007 Legends.

Goritsas appeared as Levene in the 2011 superhero film X-Men: First Class, featuring Hugh Jackman, James McAvoy, Michael Fassbender, Kevin Bacon and Nicholas Hoult. He appeared as Parker in the 1998 Steven Spielberg film Saving Private Ryan, featuring Tom Hanks, Tom Sizemore, Edward Burns and Matt Damon.

He appeared in films such as Sky Captain and the World of Tomorrow, A Mighty Heart, Darkest Hour, National Treasure: Book of Secrets, The Road to Guantanamo, The Catcher Was a Spy and Thunderbirds.

His television credits include The New Addams Family, Hawkeye, Highlander: The Series, Black Mirror and Episodes.

In 2020, he appeared as Bernie Peterson in the TNT original drama series The Alienist'''s second season, The Alienist: Angel of Darkness.

Goritsas played actor Roy Scheider in The Shark is Broken, Ian Shaw and Joseph Nixon's stage play about the making of the motion picture Jaws (1975). The Shark is Broken'' was staged at the Edinburgh Festival Fringe in August 2019, starring Ian Shaw as Robert Shaw, Liam Murray Scott as Richard Dreyfuss, and Duncan Henderson as Roy Scheider. Goritsas replaced Henderson in the role of Scheider for the played successful run at London's West End from October 2021-January 2022.
"The Shark is Broken" transferred to the Royal Alexandra Theatre for a run from September-November 2022.

Filmography

Film

Television

Video games

References

External links
 
 demetrigoritsas.com

Living people
20th-century American male actors
21st-century American male actors
American expatriate male actors in the United Kingdom
American expatriates in Canada
American expatriates in England
American male film actors
American male television actors
American male voice actors
American people of Greek descent
American people of Norwegian descent
Year of birth missing (living people)